The Baku Musical College (now the Azerbaijan National Conservatory Music College) is a state college of professional secondary education in Baku and one of the leading secondary musical schools of Azerbaijan.

General information
Baku Musical College is a four-year special secondary school. About 1,400 students study and 400 pedagogues teach there. More than 8,000 musical personnel studied in this college since its foundation. Nazim Kazimov, "Honored Art Worker of Azerbaijan" is a chairman of the college.

History
In 1885, Antonina Yermolayeva, alumni of the Moscow Conservatory, opened a private music school with the support of her sisters Yelizaveta and Yevgeniya. Antonina Yermolayeva became director of the school. Musical classes under the Baku department of the "Musical Union of Russia" were opened on the basis of this school in 1901. Antonina Yermolayeva was in charge of them too. Education in these classes were professional. In 1916, musical courses were transformed into a musical school. Pedagogical staff of the school mainly consisted of alumnus of Russian conservatoires. Education was based on the curriculum which was accepted in Saint Petersburg and Moscow, in the beginning of the 19th century. In, 1922, Uzeyir Hajibeyov, eminent Azerbaijani composer led the school. New faculties, where foundation of theory and play on Eastern instruments was also taught along with the European instruments, were opened in time of Uzeyir Hajibeyov's direction (1922-1926 and 1939-1941). In 1953, the school was named after Asaf Zeynally, an Azerbaijani composer and pedagogue.

Famous alumni
 Khan Shushinski
 Asaf Zeynally
 Said Rustamov
 Sabina Babayeva
 Ahmad Bakikhanov
 Muslim Magomayev
 Zeynab Khanlarova
 Alim Qasimov
 Lutfiyar Imanov
 Valentin Jenevskiy

References

Music schools in Azerbaijan
Universities in Baku
Music venues in Azerbaijan
Educational institutions established in 1916
1916 establishments in the Russian Empire